Angel Koritarov (11 November 1941 – 8 February 2019) was a Bulgarian volleyball player. He competed at the 1964 Summer Olympics and the 1968 Summer Olympics.

References

1941 births
2019 deaths
Bulgarian men's volleyball players
Olympic volleyball players of Bulgaria
Volleyball players at the 1964 Summer Olympics
Volleyball players at the 1968 Summer Olympics
People from Pernik